Route 104 is a bus route operated by SEPTA between Upper Darby's 69th Street Transportation Center and the North Campus of West Chester University in West Chester, Pennsylvania.  Route 104 initially was a streetcar line which operated parallel to the West Chester Pike (PA Route 3) and was operated by the Philadelphia Suburban Transportation Company (a.k.a. "Red Arrow Lines").

History

Rail service
 

Route 104 was established in 1895, by the newly established Philadelphia and West Chester Traction Company. In 1936, the P&W went bankrupt and was reorganized as the Philadelphia Suburban Transit Company taking the line with it. At the corner of West Chester Pike and Darby Road was the Battle of Llanerch which was a physical and legal struggle between the PRR and the Philadelphia and West Chester Traction Company. There was concern that a new trolley to Newtown would hurt the PRR line to Newtown and therefore they tried to block it as they had to cross each other at this location.

In 1954, rail service was cut back to the Westgate Hills section of Haverford Township in order to allow the Pennsylvania Department of Highways (now PennDOT) to expand the highway into its current configuration. By 1958, all rail service on the West Chester Pike corridor was replaced by bus service.

Bus service

For many years, bus service operated along the entire length of West Chester Pike between 69th Street Transportation Center and the terminus of the Pike, just east of West Chester Borough, where West Chester Pike and Paoli Pike merge to form Gay Street (from the westbound direction) and Market Street (from the eastbound direction). Service operated via Gay Street, New Street, and Market Street, laying over on Market just east of New.

In the late 1990s, selected weekday peak hour short-turn trips were extended from the center of Newtown Square in Delaware County to serve the Newtown Square Corporate Campus just west of the center of town.

In 2002, service was extended to serve West Chester University, eliminating a 10- to 15-minute walk not just for college students, but also for residents of the borough's south end neighborhoods. This eliminated the simple loop routing that had been in effect for many years previously.

In addition, a new evening routing operated directly into the Edgmont Square Shopping Center, a rapidly developing retail complex in Edgmont Township, just west of the Edgmont/Newtown township boundary.

Route description
 
Today, Route 104 operates service to West Chester every 10–20 minutes during weekday peak hours, every 30 minutes during weekday hours and late Saturday afternoons, and every hour on evenings, Saturdays, and Sundays.  Short-turn trips to Newtown Square provide 10-minute headways to that town during weekday peak hours, and 30-minute service levels on Saturdays and Sundays.

References

External links
SEPTA Route 104 Schedules and Map

Bus transportation in Pennsylvania
104
104
Tram routes in Philadelphia
Transportation in Philadelphia
Railway lines opened in 1895
Railway lines closed in 1958
1895 establishments in Pennsylvania
Interurban railways in Pennsylvania